This is a list of cultural venues in Cardiff, capital city of Wales.

Sport

Performing arts
Performing arts venues with seating capacity:
City Hall, Cardiff (600)
Chapter Arts Centre (180)
Llanover Hall Arts Centre  (100)
New Theatre (Cardiff) (1,144)
Royal Welsh College of Music & Drama
Dora Stoutzker Hall (400)
Richard Burton Theatre (182)
Bute Theatre (150-200)
Caird Studio (50)
Corus Recital Room (50)
S4C Studio (50)
Sir Geraint Evans Recital Room (60)
Weston Gallery (80)
Sherman Theatre
Main theatre (631)
Venue 2 (163)
Venue 3
St David's Hall
Main auditorium (up to 1,956)
Level 3 Day Stage (or "Level 3 Bar") (350 including standing)
Wales Millennium Centre (Canolfan Mileniwm Cymru)
Dance Space (100)
Donald Gordon Theatre (1,897)
Urdd Hall (153)
Weston Studio (250)
BBC Hoddinott Hall (350)
Roald Dahl Plass (Outdoor Arena)

Entertainment venues
Cardiff University Students' Union
Mermaid Quay
Millennium Plaza
Motorpoint Arena Cardiff
Red Dragon Centre
The Glee Club

Live music venues
Barfly (200) - opened in 2001, closed in September 2010 
Clwb Ifor Bach
Coal Exchange (1,000) - Venue closed in 2007, reopened in 2009 and closed again in 2013 because of safety concerns.
The Globe (350) - opened on Albany Road, Roath, in November 2008.
Inkspot Venue Cardiff - conference rooms, live music events
The Moon Club, Womanby Street
The Point (500) - closed in January 2009, following a single complaint from a neighbour about noise.
Tramshed (1000) - opened in October 2015 in a converted Grade II listed tram depot in Grangetown.
Y Plas - in the Cardiff University Students' Union building in Cathays

Gay venues
Cardiff has number of gay venues in the city, particularly in the area around Charles Street and Churchill Way. Gay-friendly venues include:
 Golden Cross -  a pub featuring regular drag acts
 Kings Cross, The Hayes - gay-friendly pub for over 35 years, converted to a gastropub in 2011

Historic and architectural venues
This is a list of historic and architectural places and their use as a cultural venue:
Cardiff Bay and Cardiff Barrage (has hosted open-air concerts)
Bute Park (used for open-air concerts and festivals)
Cardiff Castle (has hosted open-air concerts, a professional boxing match and small exhibitions)
Castell Coch (has hosted a celebrity renewal of wedding vows)

Museums and art galleries
Blackwater Gallery, Cardiff Bay
Butetown History and Arts Centre, Cardiff Bay
National Museum and Gallery, Cathays Park
Museum of Welsh Life, St Fagans
Cardiff Story
Welsh Regiment Museum
Norwegian Church Arts Centre, Cardiff Bay
G39 - art gallery, opened 1998 in the city centre and relocated to a larger space off City Road, Roath in 2012.
tactileBOSCH, Llandaff
Third Floor Gallery, Cardiff Bay

Libraries
Canton Library
Cathays Library
Central Library
Ely Library
Fairwater Library
Grangetown Library
Llandaff North Library
Llanedeyrn Library
Llanishen Library
Llanrumney Library
Penylan Library
Radyr Library
Roath Library (closed in 2014)
Rhiwbina Library
Rhydypennau Library
Rumney Library
Splott Library
St Mellons Library
Tongwynlais Library
Whitchurch Library

Places of worship

See also
List of places in Cardiff
List of places in Wales

References

Cultural venues

Tourist attractions in Cardiff